Pascal Kina is a Belgian field hockey coach. At the 2012 Summer Olympics he coached the Belgium women's national field hockey team. He is the father of Belgian field hockey player Antoine Kina.

References

Living people
Belgian field hockey coaches
Year of birth missing (living people)
Place of birth missing (living people)
21st-century Belgian people